Andrzej Zawada (born Maria Andrzej Zawada; 16 July 1928 – 21 August 2000) was a Polish mountaineer, pioneer of winter Himalayism. Zawada was an organiser and leader in numerous high-mountains expeditions. Author of movies and photographs from expeditions, co-author of Alpinist books. Honorary member of the British Alpine Club, French Groupe de Haute Montagne and American The Explorers Club.

Grandson of Tomasz Rawicz-Zawada young participant of January Uprising in 1863. Son of Filip Rawicz Zawada, Polish legionnaire and consul.

Zawada studied physics and geophysics in Wrocław and Warsaw. Received an engineer's degree in seismology. In 1955–1993 he worked at the Institute of Geophysics of the Polish Academy of Sciences.

Amongst climbers he is known for his phrase: "Tell me, what you did in the winter in the Tatras, and I'll tell you what climber you are".

Selected expeditions

 In 1959 he was a leader to a first winter crossing through the whole main ridge of Tatra Mountains, which took 19 days.
 In 1971, as chief he led the Polish expedition to make the first ascent to the Khunyang Chhish in the Karakoram. He also reached the summit.
 With Tadeusz Piotrowski he made the first winter ascent of Noshaq in the Hindu Kush (13 February 1973). It was the world's first winter climb above .
 In February 1980 Krzysztof Wielicki and Leszek Cichy made the first winter ascent of Mount Everest, the highest mountain on Earth. Zawada led the expedition. It was the first winter ascent of a peak above 8,000 m.
 In May 1980 Zawada led an expedition of Everest with Andrzej Czok and Jerzy Kukuczka and ascended a new route.
 In February 1985 Maciej Berbeka and Maciej Pawlikowski made the first winter ascent of Cho Oyu. It is the only winter ascent on an eight-thousander using a new route. Zawada led the expedition.
 On 31 December 1988 Krzysztof Wielicki made the first winter ascent of Lhotse. Zawada led the expedition.

Books

References

External links
 

1928 births
2000 deaths
Polish mountain climbers
Polish summiters of Mount Everest
Sportspeople from Olsztyn
People from East Prussia